Anthidium bischoffi is a species of bee in the family Megachilidae, the leaf-cutter, carder, or mason bees.

Synonyms
Synonyms for this species include:
Anthidium bischoffi dzhachramicum Popov, 1967
Anthidium bischoffi var hoggaricum Mavromoustakis, 1954

References

bischoffi
Insects described in 1954